Sarvabhauma Bhattacharya was medieval Pandit and Bhakti reformer from Kamrup. As a vedantist of the Advaita school, he refuted the monistic doctrines of Sankaradeva.

See also
 Adwita Makaranda
 Chaitanya Mahaprabhu

References

Year of birth missing
Year of death missing
Bengali people
15th-century Indian philosophers